Carlos Grangel (born 1963 in Barcelona) is a Spanish-born character designer for animated films.

Career
He started out as a comic book artist, drawing Fix und Foxi for the German market from the mid-80s to 1994 and Disney comics (Brer Rabbit) for the Dutch market in 1994/95. Afterwards he moved to DreamWorks Animation, where his credits include The Road to El Dorado (2000), Spirit: Stallion of the Cimarron (2002), Shark Tale (2004) and Madagascar (2005). He also worked on Tim Burton's Corpse Bride (2005).

He owns Grangel Studios along with his brother Jordi. He loves challenges such as creating Nemo.

Filmography
We're Back! A Dinosaur's Story (1993)
Balto (1995)
The Fearless Four (1997)
The Prince of Egypt (1998)
Periwig Maker (1999)
The Road to El Dorado (2000)
Joseph: King of Dreams (2000)
Spirit: Stallion of the Cimarron (2002)
Sinbad: Legend of the Seven Seas (2003)
Till Eulenspiegel (2003)
Shark Tale (2004)
Madagascar (2005)
Corpse Bride (2005)
Hui Buh (2006)
The Pirates! In an Adventure with Scientists! (2012)
Hotel Transylvania (2012)
Ron's Gone Wrong (2021)

Recognition
2003, won Annie Award for 'Individual Achievement in Character Design' for Spirit: Stallion of the Cimarron (2002).
2005, nominated for Annie Award for 'Character Design in an Animated Feature Production' for Shark Tale (2004)
2006, nominated for Annie Award for 'Best Character Design in an Animated Feature Production' for Corpse Bride (2005)

References

External links

Article on Carlos Grangel in Kaukapedia 
Official Website

1963 births
Living people
Annie Award winners
Spanish comics artists
Artists from Barcelona